Sumner Hill is an unincorporated community in Madera County, California. It lies at an elevation of 535 feet (163 m).

References

Unincorporated communities in California
Unincorporated communities in Madera County, California